Gregers Arndal-Lauritzen (born 3 May 1998) is a Danish footballer who plays as a left-back for Danish 1st Division club Hillerød.

Club career
Arndal-Lauritzen started playing for BK Søllerød-Vedbæk before signing a youth contract with Brøndby IF, joining the club's under-14 team. On 20 July 2017, Arndal-Lauritzen first appeared on the first-team bench during the 2017–18 season, in a 1–2 UEFA Europa League qualifier loss to Finnish club VPS. On 21 September 2017, he made his first appearance for Brøndby, starting in the Danish Cup match against Ledøje-Smørum Fodbold, which Brøndby won 5–1.

On 28 December 2017, Arndal-Lauritzen moved to second division club HB Køge on loan until the end of the 2017–18 season. He subsequently stated that he "came to play" and needed playing time in order to evolve as a player. He made his first-team debut for HB Køge on 11 March, making his first ever league start and scoring his first first-team goal in the 34th minute of a 3–2 win home over Thisted FC. He ended the season scoring one goal in 13 matches.

Arndal-Lauritzen and Brøndby agreed to terminate the players contract on 31 January 2019. On 11 February 2019, he then signed with AC Horsens on a six-month contract.

In October 2019, Arndal-Lauritzen started playing for third-tier club Skovshoved IF in the Danish 2nd Division. On 11 June 2021, Arndal-Lauritzen moved to fellow league club Hellerup IK. In July 2022, Arndal-Lauritzen moved to newly promoted Danish 1st Division club Hillerød.

References

External links
 Gregers Arndal-Lauritzen at Soccerbase

1998 births
Living people
Danish men's footballers
Denmark youth international footballers
BK Søllerød-Vedbæk players
Brøndby IF players
HB Køge players
AC Horsens players
Skovshoved IF players
Hellerup IK players
Hillerød Fodbold players
Danish Superliga players
Danish 1st Division players
Danish 2nd Division players
Association football fullbacks